Oliver Leydon-Davis (born 10 May 1990) is a New Zealand badminton player. He won the Oceania Championships title in the mixed doubles in 2014, and in the men's doubles in 2020.

Achievements

Oceania Championships 
Men's doubles

Mixed doubles

BWF International Challenge/Series (8 titles, 10 runners-up) 
Men's doubles

Mixed doubles

  BWF International Challenge tournament
  BWF International Series tournament
  BWF Future Series tournament

References

External links 
 
 Glasgow 2014

1990 births
Living people
Sportspeople from Hamilton, New Zealand
New Zealand male badminton players
Badminton players at the 2010 Commonwealth Games
Badminton players at the 2014 Commonwealth Games
Badminton players at the 2018 Commonwealth Games
Badminton players at the 2022 Commonwealth Games
Commonwealth Games competitors for New Zealand
20th-century New Zealand people
21st-century New Zealand people